Ethiopia competed at the 2020 Summer Paralympics in Tokyo, Japan, from 24 August to 5 September 2021.

Medalists

Competitors
The following is the list of number of competitors participating in the Games:

Athletics 

Men's track

Women's track

See also 
Ethiopia at the Paralympics
Ethiopia at the 2020 Summer Olympics

References 

2020
Nations at the 2020 Summer Paralympics
Paralympics